Batagay-Alyta (Baatağay Alııta), also known as Sakkyryr (Saqqırıır) is a rural locality (a selo) and the administrative center of Eveno-Bytantaysky National District in the Sakha Republic, Russia. Its population as of the 2010 Census was 1,832.

Geography
Batagay-Alyta is located on the eastern flank of the Verkhoyansk Range, and southeast of the southern end of the Sietinden Range and southwest of the Kular Range.

History
It was founded in 1936 as the administrative center for the then newly created Sakkyryrsky District. It lost this function with the dissolution of the district in 1963, but regained it with the creation of Eveno-Bytantaysky District in 1989.

Demographics
Population:  

The population includes a large proportion of Evens, with the Even language taught in the local school.

Transportation
Batagay-Alyta is served by the Sakkyryr Airport . There are no year-round roads connecting to Batagay-Alyta, although a winter road offers a route east to Verkhoyansk and Batagay when the rivers are frozen.

Climate
Batagay-Alyta has an extremely cold subarctic climate (Köppen climate classification Dfd) with long, extremely cold winters and short, mild (sometimes warm) summers. The seasonal temperature variation is among the greatest in the world. Precipitation is very low, but somewhat higher in the summer.

References

Notes

Sources
Official website of the Sakha Republic. Registry of the Administrative-Territorial Divisions of the Sakha Republic. Eveno-Bytantaysky National District. 

Rural localities in the Sakha Republic
Populated places of Arctic Russia
Road-inaccessible communities of the Sakha Republic